Pasi Koskinen (born January 1972) is a Finnish metal vocalist and musician, currently the vocalist and guitarist of the band Datura Nemesis (2013–), but he is perhaps best known as the vocalist of the band Amorphis (1995–2004).

Koskinen was also the vocalist of the bands St. Mucus, (a band he created under that name and also was the guitarist) from 1992 to 1994, Ajattara (under the alias I. Ruoja Suruntuoja and was also the guitarist plus did some keyboards) from 1998 to 2012, Shape of Despair from 2001 to 2010, To Separate the Flesh from the Bones (under the alias Herr Arschstein and was also the guitarist) from 2004 to 2006 & Mannhai from 2005 to 2009.

Koskinen did co-vocal production on Zero Nexus by Shade Empire, guest vocals on the songs "Vapahtaja" on the album Vuoroveri by Saattue, and "Asmodee" on the album Womb of Lilithu by Necrophobic.

Discography

St. Mucus 
Evacuate the Bowels

Amorphis 
Elegy
My Kantele
Divinity / Northern Lights
Tuonela – composition
Story – 10th Anniversary
Alone
Am Universum  – lyrics
Day of Your Beliefs –  Lyrics
Far from the Sun – lyrics
Evil Inside – lyrics
Chapters
Forging the Land of Thousand Lakes – some lyrics
Magic & Mayhem: Tales from the Early Years – some lyrics

Ajattara 
All discography (see Ajattara)

Shape of Despair 
Angels of Distress – (as "P.K.")
Illusion's Play
Written in My Scars – lyrics

To Separate the Flesh from the Bones 
All Discography (see To Separate the Flesh from the Bones)

Mannhai 
Spaceball
Hellroad Caravan – lyrics (track 1–5, 7–10) (as "Pasi")
Under the Sign of the Wolf – (as "Pasi")

References 

1972 births
Living people
Amorphis members
Black metal musicians
Death metal musicians
Finnish heavy metal guitarists
Finnish heavy metal singers
20th-century Finnish male singers
21st-century guitarists